Beinn Bheag (736 m) is a mountain in the Northwest Highlands of Scotland. It lies in the Ardgour area of Lochaber, west of the village of Corran.

The peak is one of three that forms an east facing horseshoe, along with Garbh Bheinn and Sgorr Mhic Eacharna. It is usually climbed from the A861 road.

References

Marilyns of Scotland
Grahams
Mountains and hills of the Northwest Highlands